Borjeleh (also Romanized as Barchaleh and Borjlah; also known as Rajeleh) is a village in Pachehlak-e Gharbi Rural District, in the Central District of Azna County, Lorestan Province, Iran. At the 2006 census, its population was 506, in 92 families.

References 

Towns and villages in Azna County